Amy Yip (born 10 July 1966) is an actress who was one of the leading sex symbols of Hong Kong Cinema in the late 1980s and early 1990s. Yip is best known for her roles in Hong Kong Category III films such as Sex and Zen and Erotic Ghost Story. Sex and Zen is the highest grossing Category III movie in the history of Hong Kong box office.

Career
Born in Hong Kong on 10 July 1966, she has family roots in Taishan, Guangdong. Yip first came to notice by appearing in various television series in the mid-1980s. The 1990 film Erotic Ghost Story proved to be a breakthrough role and she became one of the most popular actresses in Hong Kong and many other parts of Asia in the early 1990s. She had large, full breasts which made her much in demand for nude scenes. However she refused to appear fully naked on film. Her efforts to avoid fully exposing her breasts on screen through clever use of camera angles, whereby the side of her breast is seen, became known as the "Yip tease". However, in Erotic Ghost Story for example, she did show her buttocks in one scene.

She retired from acting in 1997. She expressed regret that, given the nature of her films, there were not many memorable roles during her acting career. The only exceptional movie for her was the 1991 movie Queen of the Underworld which she portrayed Sister Har, a woman who climbed from the lowest depths of society to become the celebrated queen of the night life in the 1960s and 1970s of Hong Kong.

Personal life
In 1990, a Hong Kong man was sent to prison and charged for stealing money. This man said he stole money in order to sustain Amy Yip's luxurious lifestyle. However, Amy Yip said she had only met the man few times and the man was not a close friend.

Yip's long term boyfriend was the orthopedics surgeon Dr. Sammy Sek Chiu Lui; the pair met in 1992. Numerous rumours have surfaced over the years about Yip marrying Lui, and being pregnant. In an interview in early 2006 with an East Weekly reporter, who spotted Yip walking her dog at Repulse Bay, however, she said she was in a steady relationship with her boyfriend of more than 15 years and had no intention of getting married or having children. She added she had food and beverage businesses set up in Hong Kong and Macau that kept her busy and occupied. 

When asked if she would consider a comeback into the film business, Yip flatly rejected the idea, saying that she was very happy with her carefree lifestyle and had no desire of returning to filming long hours and traveling intensively for movies and record publicity. She also said that she is content with not showing her breasts to make a living.

In May 2018 an English language book detailing her career in movies and television was released. Her boyfriend Lui died of a heart attack while flying to the United States in November 2018.

Filmography

 Di xia cai jue a.k.a. Underground Judgement 1994
 Bu wen sao a.k.a. Stooges in Hong Kong 1992
 The Prince of Temple Street 1992
 Te qu ai nu a.k.a. China Dolls 1992
 Sex and Zen 1991
 To Be Number One 1991
 Jiang shi fu xing zi a.k.a. Vampire Kids 1991
 Lao biao fa qian han a.k.a. Easy Money 1991
 Liao zhai yan tan xu ji zhi wu tong shen a.k.a. Erotic Ghost Story 2 1991
 Long mao shao xu a.k.a. Lethal Contact 1991
 Nu ji xie ren a.k.a. Robotrix 1991
 Great Pretenders 1991
 Magnificent Scoundrels 1991
 Ye sheng huo nu wang - Ba jie chuan qi a.k.a. Queen of the Underworld 1991
 Zhuo niu zi ku de zhong kui a.k.a. The Blue Jean Monster 1991
 Hua gui zhu zheng ge li a.k.a. My Neighbor's Phantoms 1990
 Huang jia du chuan a.k.a. Raid on Royal Casino Marine  1990
 She Shoots Straight 1990
 Legend of the Dragon 1990 (cameo)
 Tian shi zhuo jian a.k.a. Ghostly Vixen 1990
 Xiao xin jian die a.k.a. To Spy With Love 1990
 Hoi sam gui miu ba a.k.a. Mr Sunshine 1989
 Feng huo shuo ming a.k.a. Club Le TV series 1986
 The Romance of the White Hair Maiden TV series 1986
 Jiu gao man ng TV series

Cultural influence
One of the nicknames for her, boba (which means "champion of breasts"), was adopted as the name of the tapioca pearls in Taiwanese bubble tea during the 1980s.

Nam Kee Pau, a baozi chain in Singapore, sells a large-sized steamed bun named Amy Yip Big Pau.

References

External links
 
 Love HK Film page on Amy Yip
 HK cinemagic entry

1966 births
Living people
20th-century Hong Kong actresses
Hong Kong film actresses